{{DISPLAYTITLE:C19H22O6}}
The molecular formula C19H22O6 (molar mass: 346.37 g/mol, exact mass: 346.141638 u) may refer to:

 Atrop-abyssomicin_C
 Cynaropicrin, a bioactive sesquiterpene lactone
 Dihydrokanakugiol, a dihydrochalcone
 Gibberellic acid, a hormone found in plants